Sakshi Malik may refer to:

 Sakshi Malik (born 1992), Indian freestyle wrestler
 Sakshi Malik (actress) (born 1996), Indian actress and model

See also
 Sakshi (disambiguation)